Trousdale County, also known as Hartsville/Trousdale County, is a county in the U.S. state of Tennessee. As of the 2020 census, the population was 11,615. Its county seat is Hartsville, with which it shares a uniquely formed consolidated city-county government. With an area of just , it is Tennessee's smallest county.

Trousdale County is part of the Nashville-Davidson–Murfreesboro–Franklin, TN Metropolitan Statistical Area, although it is located just beyond the ring of "bedroom communities" in the Nashville metropolitan area. Farming and livestock-raising characterize this largely rural area.

Hartsville is the county seat of Trousdale County and now coextensive with it as a metropolitan government by virtue of a referendum which passed in Trousdale County by a single vote. Trousdale County High School is located here, as well as a technical school operated by the Tennessee Board of Regents. Trousdale County is one of two counties in Tennessee to have legalized parimutuel betting on horse racing, but no group has ever stepped forward to build a racetrack.

In 2016, Corrections Corporation of America (since renamed CoreCivic) opened the Trousdale Turner Correctional Center in Hartsville. Its approximately 2,500 prisoners comprise over a fifth of the county's residents and nearly 12% of Tennessee state prisoners. The  prison became a hot spot for COVID-19 cases during the COVID-19 pandemic, giving the county the highest incidence rate in the U.S. in May 2020, with 1 in 7 residents known to be infected with coronavirus.

History
Trousdale County was formed in 1870 from parts of Macon, Smith, Sumner and Wilson counties.  It was named for William Trousdale (1790–1872), Brigadier General in the Mexican War, Governor of Tennessee, 1849–1851, and U.S. Minister to Brazil, 1853–1857. Hartsvillians had initially sought the creation of their own, separate county in 1849, but the effort failed.

On December 7, 1862, The Battle of Hartsville occurred within the boundaries of the county (although Trousdale County was not officially a county until 1870), with the Confederate forces under John Hunt Morgan defeating the Union forces of Absalom B. Moore in a surprise attack on their campsite. Morgan captured most of the Union forces and marched them South to Lebanon, Tennessee.

In the early part of the 20th century, a series of floods left the county seat devastated, with some floodwaters reaching flood stage of nine to twelve feet. There are photographs showing residents of the county canoeing in front of the flooded courthouse.
During the Second World War, American infantry often trained in Trousdale County, simulating battles and participating in minor war games on the countryside owned by local farmers. After the war, the county flourished with the railroad running through the county. However, after the trains stopped running through the county, business slowed and suffered economically.

In 2020, an outbreak of COVID-19 at the Trousdale Turner Correctional Center, a privately operated prison, made Trousdale County the county with the highest per capita infection rate in the United States as of May 5, 2020. As of May 8, 1,284 prisoners at Trousdale had tested positive for the coronavirus, as had 50 employees and contractors at the facility.

Geography

It is the smallest county by area in Tennessee.

Adjacent counties

Macon County (north)
Smith County (east)
Wilson County (south)
Sumner County (west)

State protected areas
Old Hickory Wildlife Management Area (part)

Highways

Demographics

2020 census

As of the 2020 United States census, there were 11,615 people, 3,189 households, and 2,083 families residing in the county.

2000 census
As of the census of 2000, there were 7,259 people, 2,780 households, and 2,034 families residing in the county.  The population density was 64 people per square mile (25/km2).  There were 3,095 housing units at an average density of 27 per square mile (10/km2).  The racial makeup of the county was 86.57% White, 11.35% Black or African American, 0.23% Native American, 0.11% Asian, 0.03% Pacific Islander, 0.99% from other races, and 0.72% from two or more races.  1.52% of the population were Hispanic or Latino of any race.

There were 2,780 households, out of which 31.90% had children under the age of 18 living with them, 58.30% were married couples living together, 11.30% had a female householder with no husband present, and 26.80% were non-families. 23.00% of all households were made up of individuals, and 10.30% had someone living alone who was 65 years of age or older.  The average household size was 2.55 and the average family size was 2.99.

In the county, the population was spread out, with 24.20% under the age of 18, 8.50% from 18 to 24, 28.10% from 25 to 44, 24.90% from 45 to 64, and 14.30% who were 65 years of age or older.  The median age was 38 years. For every 100 females, there were 96.90 males.  For every 100 females age 18 and over, there were 92.40 males.

The median income for a household in the county was $32,212, and the median income for a family was $37,401. Males had a median income of $27,466 versus $21,207 for females. The per capita income for the county was $15,838.  About 9.70% of families and 13.40% of the population were below the poverty line, including 14.00% of those under age 18 and 20.00% of those age 65 or over.

Communities

Hartsville, the county seat, is the only officially constituted municipality in Trousdale County.  Unincorporated communities include:

 Beech Grove
 Shady Grove

Politics

See also
 National Register of Historic Places listings in Trousdale County, Tennessee

References

External links

 Official website
 TNGenWeb
 Tennessee Central Economic Alliance for Trousdale County
 

 
1870 establishments in Tennessee
Populated places established in 1870
Nashville metropolitan area
Middle Tennessee